Lieutenant General Joseph May Swing (February 28, 1894 – December 9, 1984) was a senior United States Army officer, who fought in World War I and commanded the 11th Airborne Division during the campaign to liberate the Philippines in World War II.

Early life and military career

Joseph May Swing was born in Jersey City, New Jersey, on February 28, 1894, son of Mary Ann (née Snellgrove) and Joseph Swing. He attended the United States Military Academy at West Point and was commissioned a second lieutenant upon graduation in 1915 (as part of "the class the stars fell on"). In 1916, he served in John J. Pershing Punitive Expedition against Pancho Villa in Mexico. During World War I, he served in France with the 1st Infantry Division. After returning to the United States, he served as an aide to General Peyton March, who soon became Chief of Staff of the United States Army. He married General March's daughter, Josephine, on July 8, 1918.

Between the wars
After the war, Swing continued his career in the artillery, graduating with honors from the United States Army Field Artillery School at Fort Sill, Oklahoma. In 1927 he graduated from the Command and General Staff School at Fort Leavenworth, Kansas, and in 1935 he graduated from the United States Army War College in Washington D.C. On June 24, 1936 he was promoted to lieutenant colonel. From 1938 to 1940 he served as chief of staff for the 2nd Infantry Division, then as commander of artillery for the 1st Cavalry Division. On June 26, 1941 he was promoted to colonel in the Army of the United States (AUS).

World War II
Swing was promoted to brigadier general (AUS) on February 16, 1942 and organized the division artillery of the 82nd Infantry Division, shortly before their conversion to an airborne division.

After being promoted to the temporary rank of major general, on February 15, 1943 Swing activated the newly formed 11th Airborne Division at Camp Mackall, North Carolina. He was then sent to the Mediterranean Theater of Operations (MTO) to assist with planning the airborne operations conducted during Operation Husky, the invasion of Sicily. His permanent rank was upgraded from lieutenant colonel to colonel on August 1, 1943.

After returning to the United States, he continued to oversee the training of the 11th Airborne Division, leading them to a successful victory in the Knollwood training maneuver on December 7, 1943. The performance of Swing and the 11th Airborne is credited with saving the concept of the airborne division.

Swing and the officers and men of the 11th Airborne Division shipped out for the Southwest Pacific in May 1944. He would lead the division for the duration of the war, from the invasion of the Philippines to the occupation of Japan. Swing and the 11th Airborne greeted General Douglas MacArthur upon his arrival in Japan at Atsugi Airdrome on August 30, 1945.

Postwar

Swing commanded the 11th Airborne Division, during which time his permanent rank became brigadier general on June 16, 1947, until 1948 when he was assigned command of I Corps in Kyoto, Japan. On January 24, 1948 his rank was made major general. This was followed by a stint as commandant of the Field Artillery School at Fort Sill, then as commandant of the Army War College at Carlisle Barracks, Pennsylvania. His final posting was as commander of the Sixth Army in San Francisco in 1951. Swing retired from active duty on February 28, 1954, retiring with the rank of lieutenant general.

After leaving the army, his friend and former West Point classmate President Dwight D. Eisenhower nominated him as the Commissioner of Immigration and Naturalization. Following confirmation, Swing served as the head of the INS from 1954 to 1962. Among the programs he implemented was the controversial Operation Wetback (1954), designed to slow the number of illegal border crossings from Mexico.

Swing died in San Francisco at the age of 90 on December 9, 1984, and is buried at Arlington National Cemetery, in Arlington, Virginia with his wife Josephine Mary Swing (1895–1972).

Decorations
   Parachutist Badge
   Distinguished Service Cross
   Army Distinguished Service Medal
   Silver Star with two oak leaf clusters
   Legion of Merit
   Bronze Star Medal with two oak leaf clusters
   Air Medal with oak leaf cluster

References

External links

Biography from U.S. Citizenship and Immigration Services website

Washington Post obituary, dated 12 December 1984
Generals of World War II

|-

|-

|-

|-

1894 births
1984 deaths
United States Army Field Artillery Branch personnel
United States Army generals
United States Military Academy alumni
Recipients of the Distinguished Service Cross (United States)
Recipients of the Distinguished Service Medal (US Army)
Recipients of the Silver Star
Recipients of the Legion of Merit
People from Jersey City, New Jersey
Recipients of the Air Medal
Burials at Arlington National Cemetery
Graduates of the United States Military Academy Class of 1915
United States Army personnel of World War I
United States Army generals of World War II
United States Army Command and General Staff College alumni
United States Army War College alumni
Military personnel from New Jersey